The Watsons Bay ferry service, officially known as F9 Watsons Bay, is a commuter ferry service in Sydney, New South Wales. Part of the Sydney Ferries network, it is operated by Transdev Sydney Ferries and services the Rose Bay and Watsons Bay areas. It began operation on 25 October 2020 and replaced the eastern half of the F4 Cross Harbour service. Emerald-class ferries and SuperCat ferries operate the service.

History 
Following community consultation jointly held by the ferry operator Transdev Sydney Ferries and Transport for NSW in 2019–2020, the F4 route was divided into F4 Pyrmont Bay and F9  Watsons Bay services on 25 October 2020.

Service

Wharves

Patronage
The following table shows the patronage of Sydney Ferries network for the year ending 30 June 2022.

References

External links

Ferry transport in Sydney
Watsons Bay, New South Wales